Dunkerley or Dunckerley is a surname. Notable people with the surname include:

David Dunkerley, rugby league footballer who played in the 1970s and 1980s
James Dunkerley, Professor of Politics at Queen Mary, University of London, and Director of the Institute for the Study of the Americas
Jason Dunkerley, Paralympian athlete from Canada competing mainly in category T11 middle-distance events
Roderic Dunkerley (born 1884), writer from London
Thomas Dunckerley, (born 1724), 'natural' son of King George II, freemason

See also
Dunkley (disambiguation)
6865 Dunkerley (1991 TE2), a Main-belt Asteroid discovered in 1991
Dunkerley's Method, used in mechanical engineering to determine the critical speed of a shaft-rotor system